Virginian is a demonym used to describe something as being of, from, or related to the Commonwealth of Virginia of the United States of America; it can be used as both a noun and adjective.

Virginian may also refer to:

Railroads
 Virginian (Amtrak train), a former Amtrak passenger train
 Virginian Railway, a railroad located in Virginia and West Virginia in the United States that operated from 1909 to 1959

Ships
 USS Virginian, two United States Navy vessels
 SS Virginian, a passenger ship built in 1905 that became the Swedish transatlantic liner SS Drottningholm in 1920

Other uses
 Virginian (automobile), an automobile produced briefly by the Richmond Iron Works of Richmond, Virginia
 Virginian Golf Club, a golf course in Bristol, Virginia
 Virginians, a barbershop chorus

See also
 
 The Virginian (disambiguation)
 Virginia (disambiguation)
 West Virginia (disambiguation)
 West Virginian (disambiguation)